Torosyan is an Armenian surname. Notable people with the surname include:

 Ara Torosyan (born 1972), Armenian arranger and record producer
 David Torosyan (born 1950), Soviet boxer
 Krikor Torosyan (1884–1915), Armenian satirical writer, journalist, and publisher
 Tigran Torosyan (born 1956), Armenian politician and statesman
 Ovanes Torosyan (born 1986), Stage actor and theater director

See also
Torossian

Armenian-language surnames